Babita Kumari is an Indian wrestler.

Babita Kumari may also refer to:

 Babita Kumari (Nepalese politician), a Nepalese politician